István Kovács may refer to:
István Kovács (actor) (born 1944), Hungarian actor
István Kovács (boxer) (born 1970), Hungarian Olympic boxer
István Kovács (footballer born 1920), Romanian footballer and manager
István Kovács (footballer, born 1992), Hungarian footballer
István Kovács (high jumper) (born 1973), Hungarian high jumper
István Kovács (politician) (1911–2011), Hungarian Communist politician
István Kovács (referee) (born 1984), Romanian football referee
István Kovács (water polo) (born 1957), Hungarian water polo coach
István Kovács (wrestler) (born 1950), Hungarian Olympic wrestler

See also
István Kováts (1866–1945), Hungarian Lutheran pastor, writer and historian